Qaland-e Vosta (also Romanized as Qāland-e Vosţá; also known as Kāland-e Vosţá, Kāland Vostá, and Qāland) is a village in Dodangeh Rural District, in the Central District of Behbahan County, Khuzestan Province, Iran. At the 2006 census, its population was 764, in 140 families.

References 

Populated places in Behbahan County